The Happy Valley Football Club is an Australian rules football club that competes in the Southern Football League.

History
The club first formed in 1952 playing in the former Hills Central Football League.  In 1964,  Happy Valley transferred to the Glenelg-South-West District Football Association and adopted the colours Black and Gold to avoid a clash with the Glandore club (having previously worn Blue and Gold).

In 1980, Happy Valley joined the Southern Football League Division 2 competition and in 1984 were promoted to Division 1.  Since joining Division 1, Happy Valley have been a very successful club, winning 8 A-Grade Premierships.

The Happy Valley FC continues to field teams in Senior and Junior grades in the Southern Football League and Senior women's teams in the Adelaide Football League.

Happy Valley FC has produced a number of Australian Football League (AFL) players including Ben Rutten (Adelaide), Nathan Eagleton (Western Bulldogs, Port Adelaide), Jason Porplyzia (Adelaide), Beau Waters (West Coast), Matthew Rogers (Richmond) and Tom McNamara (Melbourne).

Early References
 There are records of a Happy Valley Football Club playing against southern suburban teams in 1895.
 In 1914, Happy Valley Football Club applied to join the Alexandra Football Association but were rejected as it would "necessitate too much travelling".   Morphett Vale and McLaren Vale were accepted instead.

Coaching Unrest
Happy Valley received media coverage in May 2015 when it sacked its then club coach, Stephen Keam, only 4 games into the season after a 124-point loss to Reynella.

A-Grade Premierships
1970 Glenelg-South Adelaide Football Association Division 3
1974 Glenelg-South Adelaide Football Association Division 3
1992 Southern Football League Division 1
1993 Southern Football League Division 1
1995 Southern Football League Division 1
1996 Southern Football League Division 1
1998 Southern Football League Division 1
1999 Southern Football League Division 1
2003 Southern Football League A-Grade
2012 Southern Football League A-Grade

References

External links

 

 
 

Southern Football League (SA) Clubs
Australian rules football clubs in South Australia
1951 establishments in Australia
Australian rules football clubs established in 1951
Adelaide Footy League clubs